Thomas Pröpper (born 4 August 1970) is a German former professional footballer who played as a midfielder.

References

1970 births
Living people
German footballers
Association football midfielders
Wuppertaler SV players
Hannover 96 players
Rot-Weiss Essen players
SG Union Solingen players
Rot-Weiß Oberhausen players
Rot Weiss Ahlen players
1. FC Bocholt players
VfB Speldorf players
2. Bundesliga players
People from Dorsten
Sportspeople from Münster (region)
Footballers from North Rhine-Westphalia